Alexandru Stoian (born 15 December 2007) is a Romanian professional footballer who plays for Farul Constanța.

Early life 
Alexandru Stoian was born in Madrid, Spain, but grew up in Romania, starting to play in the Benfica academy of Bucharest, before moving to the Academica Clinceni.

Club career 
Alexandru Stoian made his professional debut for Farul Constanța on the 28 October 2022, playing the last minutes of a 1–2 away Liga I win to U Craiova. Having made his debut in this tight game, with Farul sitting top of the table, the young forward became one of the youngest footballers to ever play in the Romanian top tier at the age of 14 years, 10 months and 13 days, second only to former international Nicolae Dobrin.

International career 
Stoian is a youth international for Romania, having become by 2022 a key player of the under-16 team.

References

External links

2007 births
Living people
Romanian footballers
Romania youth international footballers
Association football forwards
Footballers from Madrid
FCV Farul Constanța players
Liga I players